William Henry Matheson (12 June 1891 – 4 November 1956) was a former Australian rules footballer who played with St Kilda, Carlton and Collingwood in the Victorian Football League (VFL).

Notes

External links 

Harry Matheson's profile at Blueseum

1891 births
Australian rules footballers from Victoria (Australia)
St Kilda Football Club players
Carlton Football Club players
Collingwood Football Club players
1956 deaths